Beļava parish is an administrative unit of the Gulbene Municipality, Latvia. The administrative center is Beļava.

Towns, villages and settlements of Beļava parish 
 Auguliena
 Auziņas
 Beļava
 Butāni
 Dumpji
 Gulbītis
 Letes
 Naglene
 Pilsskola
 Sīļi
 Spārīte
 Spriņģi
 Vanagi

References

External links

Parishes of Latvia
Gulbene Municipality